This is a list of current MeTV affiliates, arranged by U.S. state. There are links to and articles on each of the stations, describing their local programming, hosts and technical information, such as broadcast frequencies. In most markets, MeTV operates on a digital subchannel of the main station listed. In some markets, it operates on an LPTV or Class A station. The network is also available on streaming services Frndly TV and Philo.

Current affiliates
Notes:
 1 Indicates station is a primary feed MeTV affiliate.
 † Any launch dates noted are subject to change.
 Bold Owned by Weigel Broadcasting.

Former affiliates

See also
List of programs broadcast by MeTV

References

External links
 Me-TV Website-Affiliates
 RabbitEars Website

MeTV